Basque Socialist Party or Basque Socialist Assembly ( and ; ESB–PSV) was a socialist Basque political party, with presence in the Southern Basque Country. The party was illegal until 1978.

History
ESB-PSV was formed as the merge of the Basque Socialist Movement and the Aitzina group in 1975. Originally the party was social democratic and ambiguous about independence, but in 1977 ESB-PSV radicalized its positions, assuming both Basque independence and Marxism. The party participated in the Summit of Chiberta and in the Roundtable of Alsasua, being one of the founding parties of the Herri Batasuna coalition.

After a series of internal debates, ESB left Herri Batasuna in 1980, calling for abstention in the Basque elections of that year. ESB disappeared in 1980, due to its electoral failures and debts.

References

Defunct socialist parties in the Basque Country (autonomous community)
Basque nationalism
1975 establishments in Spain
Political parties established in 1975
1980 disestablishments in Spain
Political parties disestablished in 1980
Formerly banned political parties in Spain